Le Pays de France, subtitled Organe des états généraux du tourisme (The Country of France - Organ of the Estates General for Tourism), was a French newspaper of the First World War.  It originated in a monthly paper edited by Le Matin and was intended for promotion of tourism.  As a monthly it only lasted for 3 issues, with the first on 10 May 1914 and the last in July 1914.  It then became a weekly paper two months after the outbreak of war, on 12 November 1914, ceasing publication in 1919, with its final issue (numéro 219) on 26 December 1918.  Resolutely patriotic in tone, it reported battles and the wartime experiences of France's soldiers and people in reports, battle maps and photographs.

Gallery

Sources
Le Pays de France - a Travel Magazine Turned into a War Weekly sur www.greatwardifferent.com - The Great War in a Different Light
 Liste de Périodiques de la Bibliothèque Interuniversitaire de Pharmacie at www.biup.univ-paris5.fr

External links

 Photographs of covers of the Le Pays de France at tsfarg.club.fr

1914 establishments in France
1919 disestablishments in France
Defunct monthly newspapers
Defunct newspapers published in France
Defunct weekly newspapers
France in World War I
Publications established in 1914
Publications disestablished in 1919